Albert Charles Miksis (February 2, 1928 – February 4, 2012) was an American professional basketball player. He played for the Waterloo Hawks in the beginning of the 1949–50 NBA season.

References

1928 births
2012 deaths
American men's basketball players
Basketball players from Chicago
Centers (basketball)
High school basketball coaches in the United States
Sportspeople from Chicago
Sportspeople from Eugene, Oregon
Undrafted National Basketball Association players
Waterloo Hawks players
Western Illinois Leathernecks men's basketball players